Kreil is a hamlet in the Dutch province North Holland, it is located on the Westfriese Omringdijk (West-Frisian Circular Dyke) in the municipality Hollands Kroon.

Before the formation of the Hollands Kroon municipality, half of the village was in the municipality of Anna Paulowna and the other half was in the municipality of Wieringermeer

References

Populated places in North Holland
Hollands Kroon